The General Electric LM1500 is an industrial and marine gas turbine produced by GE Aviation. The LM1500 is a derivative of the General Electric J79 aircraft engine series.

History
The LM1500 was derived from the J79 engine in 1960. Its first application was for the first US sea-going research hydrofoil, . Conversion as a marinised turboshaft engine involved two major changes: the addition of a free power turbine, and corrosion-protection by the addition of internal coatings and a maintenance scheme of freshwater rinsing to prevent salt damage. Naval fuels could also include diesel fuels with higher sulphur content than aviation-grade JP-5 fuel, but this was avoided in these early engines by keeping to JP fuels.

Its first commercial use was as a catapult for launching aircraft. Over time, its commercial applications widened to include marine propulsion and its use at oil and gas pipeline compressor stations.

References

External links
 Official site (GEAE).

Aero-derivative engines
Gas turbines
Marine engines